Amazing Grace: An Anthology of Poems about Slavery is an anthology of English-language literature about slavery, most of it British and primarily by white authors. The book collects and reprints more than 400 poems about slavery written between 1660 and 1810. It was compiled and edited by Professor James Basker, and published in 2002 by Yale University Press. A revised edition was released in 2005.

External links
 Yale University Press catalogue page

2002 poetry books
2002 anthologies
American poetry anthologies
Slave narratives
Works about slavery